Lindenhurst is the name of some places in the United States:
Lindenhurst, Illinois
Lindenhurst, New York
Lindenhurst, the estate of John Wanamaker

See also
 Lyndhurst (disambiguation)